UPP Group Holdings Limited, trading as University Partnerships Programme (UPP), is a provider of on-campus residential and academic infrastructure. UPP is a real estate investment trust. 

UPP has over 36,000 rooms in operation or under construction through long-term, bespoke partnerships with 15 UK universities.

With over 800 employees, since 1998 UPP has invested over £3bn in the UK higher education sector and provided homes to over 400,000 students.

UPP founded the UPP Foundation which is a registered charity.

UPP's university partners

 University of Exeter
 University of Hull
 University of Kent 
 Lancaster University
 Leeds Beckett University
 Imperial College London 
 University of London
 Loughborough University
 University of Nottingham 
 Nottingham Trent University
 Oxford Brookes University
 University of Plymouth
 University of Reading
 University of York
 Swansea University

References

Companies established in 2004
Companies based in the City of London
Halls of residence in the United Kingdom